Clarksdale is an unincorporated community in Washington Township, Brown County, in the U.S. state of Indiana.

The community was named in honor of George Rogers Clark.

Geography

References

Unincorporated communities in Brown County, Indiana
Unincorporated communities in Indiana